Futsal club «BLIK» (Russian: Мини-футбольный клуб «БЛиК») is a former futsal club from Nefteyugansk, Russia. Disbanded in 2019 by reason of finance. Participated in Russian futsal Championship 1st division, Russian cup and Russian Championship (Superleague).

Participated in Russian championships 

Russian cup (from 2016)

Players

Squad in Superleague 2018-2019 

Coaches

 Yevgeny Osintsev - head coach

 Sergey Sokolov - assistant coach

Honours 
 Russian Championship 1st Division:
 Silver (1): 2017/2018
 Russian cup:
 1/8 finals: 2017/2018, 2018/209
 Nefteyugansk championships:
 Gold (5): 2012, 2013, 2014, 2015, 2016
 Surgut cup:
 Gold (2): 2015/2016, 2016/2017, 2017/2018
 Surgut Superleague: 
 Gold (3): 2015/2016, 2016/2017, 2017/2018
 International tournament of prize SC «Ayat», Kazakhstan:
 Silver (1): 2017/2018
 International tournament of prize Tyumen region:
 Silver (1): 2018

External links
 Page in VK

Futsal clubs in Russia
Futsal clubs established in 2012
Sports clubs disestablished in 2019
2012 establishments in Russia
2019 disestablishments in Russia